Jorge Juan Crespo de la Serna (1887 – July 24, 1978)) was a Mexican artist, art critic and art historian.

Crespo de la Serna taught at the Chouinard Art Institute around 1930. When José Clemente Orozco was commissioned to paint the Prometheus mural at Pomona College, he assisted him. He was a member of the Academia de Artes.

See also 
 Mexican muralism

External links 
 Jorge Juan Crespo de la Serna in the Ibero-American Institute's catalogue

References 

Mexican artists
Mexican art critics
Mexican art historians
1887 births
1978 deaths